Solenopsis altinodis is a species of ant first described by Forel in 1912. Workers are bi-colored with a brown gaster and a yellow head and thorax. This species has been found in Costa Rica, Colombia, Guiana, Trinidad and Venezuela. This species is often confused with Solenopsis bicolor because of the similar coloring.

References

Solenopsis (ant)
Insects described in 1912